Algoriphagus ratkowskyi is a bacterium. It is non-motile, strictly aerobic and saccharolytic.

References

Further reading
Staley, James T., et al. "Bergey's manual of systematic bacteriology, vol. 4. "Williams and Wilkins, Baltimore, MD (1989): 2250–2251.

External links
LPSN
WORMS
Type strain of Algoriphagus ratkowskyi at BacDive -  the Bacterial Diversity Metadatabase

Cytophagia
Bacteria described in 2003